The following is a list of episodes for Impostora, a Filipino drama series created by RJ Nuevas and produced by GMA Network. The series premiered on June 4, 2007 on the network's coveted GMA Telebabad block replacing Super Twins, and concluded on September 21, 2007. It also aired internationally via GMA Pinoy TV from June 20, 2007 until October 9, 2007. GMA Life TV is also aired the series' English-dubbed version from September 23, 2011 until January 10, 2012. The series headlined Sunshine Dizon, Iza Calzado, Mark Anthony Fernandez and Alfred Vargas as the lead casts. Maryo J. de los Reyes, Soxy Topacio and Lore Reyes directed the show. Winnie Hollis-Reyes and Mona Mayuga were the executive producers for the entire run of the series.

The 45-minute scripted drama chronicles the lives and loves of the former conjoined twins, Sara Carrion and Lara Carrion and how their fates are intertwined by love, deceit, hatred and vengeance.

Impostora received positive reviews from viewers and critics throughout its run and an instant hit from its debut. The series continues in syndication worldwide.

Main cast
 Sunshine Dizon as Sara carrion / Vanessa Cayetano
 Iza Calzado as Lara Carrion / Sara Carrion
 Mark Anthony Fernandez as Nicolas "Nick" Cayetano
 Alfred Vargas as Carlos Pambide
 Jean Garcia as Bettina "Betty" Carrion

List of episodes

Ratings
Viewership rankings among the Top TV shows of the week days (Mega Manila).
The peak rankings is among that day's Top TV shows.

Sources

External links
Official GMA Network website

References

Lists of soap opera episodes
Lists of Philippine drama television series episodes